Erimha is a Canadian extreme metal band from Montreal, Quebec. The band name comes from the Sumerian word for army.  The band members dress as ragged leather-clad corpses during performances.

History
Erimha recorded their debut album, Irkalla, in 2010.
The band released Reign Through Immortality in 2013 through Victory Records; the album was produced by Chris Donaldson. In 2014 the band performed in Fort Wayne, Indiana, and took part in the 2014 Mayhem Festival.

In 2015 the band released another black metal album, Thesis ov Warfare, with orchestrations by Ken Sorceron.

Discography

Studio albums 
 Irkalla (2010)
 Reign Through Immortality (2013)
 Thesis ov Warfare (2015)

Band members
 Current
 Michel "Gore" Lussier – vocals 
 Jonathan "Ksaos" Drouin – drums 
  "Kronik"  – guitars 

 Former
 Patrick "Kthien" Mercier – guitars 
 Lykan – bass 
 Alix – guitars 
 Louis-Marc "Dlusternas" Lemay – guitars 
 Leather King – bass, backing vocals

References

External links

Canadian heavy metal musical groups
Musical groups from Montreal
Musical groups established in 2010
2010 establishments in Quebec
Victory Records artists